The Sainte-Victoire National Nature Reserve (RNN117) is a national nature reserve located in the Bouches-du-Rhône department. Covering 140 hectares, the nature reserve was established in 1994 to protect the fossilized dinosaur eggs preserved on the western foot of the Montagne Sainte-Victoire.

Localisation 

The territory of the nature reserve is located in the Bouches-du-Rhône department in Provence-Alpes-Côte d'Azur, on the commune of Beaurecueil. Set on the western foot of the Montagne Sainte-Victoire, the site covers 140 ha and consists of the fossil site of Roques-Hautes. The nature reserve includes a central part named "Les Grands Creux" whose penetration is forbidden and a protection area.

History of the site and reserve

The site is known since 1947 for its paleontological deposit of dinosaur eggs.

Late Cretaceous Provence was a tropical region, occupied by a fluvio-lacustrine biotope favourable to animal reproduction, notably for the egg-laying of large reptiles, such as turtles, crocodiles and dinosaurs. The site was classified as early as 1964, under the law of 1930.

Ecology (biodiversity, ecological interest, etc.)

The principal interest of the site is paleontological, due to the presence of the dinosaur eggs fossil deposits, one of the few of such fossil sites in the world.

Roques-Hautes fossil site

The Roques-Hautes fossil site is a deposit of dinosaur eggs, located near the Montagne Sainte-Victoire in the commune of Beaurecueil, in the Argiles et Grès à Reptiles Formation. It was uncovered in 1952 by Raymond Dughi and François Sirugue, respectively curator and assistant curator of the Museum d'Histoire Naturelle Aix-en-Provence. It dates from the Late Cretaceous.

Touristic and educational interest

The nature reserve can be accessed by the south through the parking lots de Roques-Hautes, de l'Aurigon and du Toscan, served by the D17, or by the north through the road of the Bimont Dam on the commune of Saint-Marc-Jaumegarde, served by the D10.

Access to the Grands-Creux sector is forbidden to the public.

Administration, management plan, regulations

The nature reserve is managed by the Departmental Council of Bouches-du-Rhône.

Tools and legal status

The nature reserve was established by decree the 1 March 1994.

References 

Geologic formations of France
Upper Cretaceous Series of Europe
Cretaceous France
Maastrichtian Stage
Fluvial deposits
Ooliferous formations
Paleontology in France